The 2007–08 SK Rapid Wien season is the 110th season in club history.

Squad statistics

Goal scorers

Fixtures and results

Bundesliga

League table

Intertoto Cup

UEFA Cup

References

2007-08 Rapid Wien Season
Austrian football clubs 2007–08 season
Austrian football championship-winning seasons